Nyenga Mission Hospital, whose formal name is St. Francis Hospital Nyenga, but is commonly referred to as Nyenga Hospital,  is a non-profit, community hospital in Uganda. It is owned and operated by the Roman Catholic Diocese of Lugazi.

Location
The hospital is in the town of Nyenga in Buikwe District in Uganda's Central Region.

The geographical coordinates of Nyenga Hospital are 0°23'02.0"N 33°09'08.0"E
0.383889, 33.152222 (Latitude:0.383894; Longitude:33.152220).

Overview
St. Francis Hospital Nyenga is a rural community hospital that serves Buikwe District and people from parts of the neighboring districts of Kayunga,  Jinja, Buvuma, and  Mukono. The hospital was founded in 1932 as a leprosy treatment hospital by Mother Kevin, a nurse who was also a nun of the Franciscan Missionary Sisters for Africa. The hospital was later turned over to the Roman Catholic Diocese of Lugazi, whereupon it began to treat other diseases. The hospital is the teaching hospital for the St. Francis Nyenga School of Nursing. According to a September 2010 published report, the hospital had challenges of under-staffing and vandalism.

Hospital operations
As of December 2019, Nyenga Mission Hospital attended to an average of 20,102 outpatients annually. Inpatient admissions averaged 4,089 annually, with a bed occupancy rate of 28 percent. At the time, maternity deliveries averaged 404 annually, with a caesarian section rate of 37.7 percent.

See also
List of hospitals in Uganda

References

External links
 The Factors Influencing Antenatal Care Attendance Among Pregnant Women at St. Francis Hospital, Nyenga Subcounty, Buikwe District As of November 2014.

Hospitals established in 1932
Hospitals in Uganda
Buikwe District
Franciscan hospitals
Leper hospitals
1932 establishments in Uganda
Teaching hospitals in Uganda
Catholic hospitals in Africa